Eckhoff is a surname. Notable people with the surname include:

Albertus Eckhoff (1875–1949), New Zealand cricketer
Bert Eckhoff (1901–1967), New Zealand rugby league footballer
Dennis Eckhoff (1945–1995), American football player and coach
Ditlef Eckhoff (born 1942), Norwegian Jazz musician
Ernst Fredrik Eckhoff (1905–1997), Norwegian judge
Hartvig Sverdrup Eckhoff (1855-1928), Norwegian architect
Johannes Eckhoff (1919–2007), Norwegian actor
Lawrence Eckhoff (born 1952), New Zealand cricketer
Mathias Eckhoff (1925-?), Norwegian businessman
Niels Stockfleth Darre Eckhoff (1831–1914), Norwegian architect
Stian Eckhoff (born 1979), Norwegian biathlete
Tias Eckhoff (1926–2016), Norwegian industrial designer
Tiril Eckhoff (born 1990), Norwegian biathlete
Tor Eckhoff (1964-2021), Norwegian YouTuber
Torstein Eckhoff (1916–1993), Norwegian civil servant and law professor